Events from the year 1972 in Pakistan.

Incumbents

Federal government

President: Zulfikar Ali Bhutto
Chief Justice: Hamoodur Rahman

Governors

Governor of Balochistan: 
 until 11 April: Ghous Bakhsh Raisani 
 11 April-19 April: Ghaus Bakhsh Bizenjo 
 19 April-30 April: Ghous Bakhsh Raisani
 starting 30 April: Ghaus Bakhsh Bizenjo
Governor of Khyber Pakhtunkhwa: Hayat Sherpao (until 29 April); Arbab Sikandar Khan (starting 30 April)
Governor of Punjab: Ghulam Mustafa Khar 
Governor of Sindh: Mumtaz Bhutto (until 20 April); Mir Rasool Bux Talpur (starting 29 April)

Events

 Karachi labour unrest of 1972

January

 20 January -President (later Prime minister Zulfikar Ali Bhutto publicly announces that Pakistan will immediately begin a nuclear weapons programme.

 Pakistan temporarily withdraws from the Commonwealth of Nations in protest at the international recognition of Bangladesh as an independent Commonwealth republic (Pakistan returns to the Commonwealth in 1989).

July

 2 July – India and Pakistan sign the Simla Accord in Simla, India, following the surrender of the Pakistan military to Indian forces in 1971 and the subsequent emergence of former East Pakistan as the independent country of Bangladesh.

 7 July – Sindh Assembly passed the Sind Teaching, Promotion and Use of Sindhi Language Bill, 1972 which established Sindhi language as the sole official language of the province resulting in 1972 Language violence in Sindh.

August

 14 August – Pakistan celebrates 25 years as an independent country.

Births

26 April – Sana Nawaz, actress
22 May – Zabir Saeed, journalist and editor
5 August – Aaqib Javed, cricketer and coach
3 October – Aijaz Aslam, actor

Deaths

28 May – Aziz ul Haq, Chairman of the Young People's Front, a Marxist group
29 May – Prithviraj Kapoor, actor and director
1 October – Riaz Shahid, film writer and director

See also

 1971 in Pakistan
 Other events of 1972
 1973 in Pakistan
 List of Pakistani films of 1972
 Timeline of Pakistani history

 
1972 in Asia